Shelley Cramer (born October 21, 1961) is a former swimmer. She competed at the 1976, 1984 and the 1992 Summer Olympics representing the United States Virgin Islands. She was the first woman to represent the United States Virgin Islands at the Olympics.

References

External links
 

1961 births
Living people
United States Virgin Islands female swimmers
Pan American Games competitors for the United States Virgin Islands
Swimmers at the 1979 Pan American Games
Olympic swimmers of the United States Virgin Islands
Swimmers at the 1976 Summer Olympics
Swimmers at the 1984 Summer Olympics
Swimmers at the 1992 Summer Olympics
Place of birth missing (living people)
Central American and Caribbean Games gold medalists for the United States Virgin Islands
Central American and Caribbean Games medalists in swimming
Competitors at the 1978 Central American and Caribbean Games
Competitors at the 1982 Central American and Caribbean Games
21st-century American women